The 1996–97 season was the 75th season of competitive association football and 68th season in the Football League played by York City Football Club, a professional football club based in York, North Yorkshire, England. They finished in 20th position in the 24-team 1996–97 Football League Second Division. They were eliminated from the 1996–97 FA Cup in the third round by Hednesford Town, from the 1996–97 League Cup in the third round by Leicester City, and from the 1996–97 Football League Trophy in the Northern section quarter-final by Carlisle United.

31 players made at least one appearance in nationally organised first-team competition, and there were 16 different goalscorers. Defender Tony Barras played in all 57 first-team matches over the season. Neil Tolson finished as leading goalscorer with 17 goals, of which 12 came in league competition, two came in the FA Cup and three came in the League Cup.

Match details

Football League Second Division

League table (part)

FA Cup

League Cup

Football League Trophy

Appearances and goals
Numbers in parentheses denote appearances as substitute.
Players with names struck through and marked  left the club during the playing season.
Players with names in italics and marked * were on loan from another club for the whole of their season with York.
Key to positions: GK – Goalkeeper; DF – Defender; MF – Midfielder; FW – Forward

See also
List of York City F.C. seasons

References
General

Source for match dates, league positions and results: 
Source for appearances, goalscorers and attendances: 
Source for goal times (Football League Second Division, FA Cup, League Cup): 
Source for player details: 

Specific

York City F.C. seasons
York City
Foot